Alkali Ike's Auto is a 1911 American silent short comedy film directed by  Gilbert M. 'Broncho Billy' Anderson. The film is the first in the "Alkali Ike" series.

Cast
 Augustus Carney as Alkali Ike
 Harry Todd as Mustang Pete
 Margaret Joslin as Betty Brown
 Arthur Mackley as Man in Apron
 Victor Potel
 John B. O'Brien
 Fred Church

See also
 List of American films of 1911
 1911 in film

References

External links

1911 films
1911 short films
1911 comedy films
American black-and-white films
American silent short films
Silent American comedy films
American comedy short films
1910s American films